Roman Yakovlevich Dzindzichashvili (pronounced jin-jee-khash-VEE-lee; born May 5, 1944) is a Soviet-born Israeli-American chess player. He was awarded the title Grandmaster by FIDE in 1977.

Life and career
Born in Tbilisi, Georgian SSR into a family of Georgian Jews, his older brother is Nodar Djin. Dzindzichashvili won the Junior Championship of the Soviet Union in 1962 and the University Championships in 1966 and 1968. In 1970, he was awarded the title of International Master by FIDE. He left the U.S.S.R. in 1976 for Israel and earned the Grandmaster title in 1977. One of his best career performances was first place at the 53rd Hastings Chess Festival in 1977/1978, scoring 10½ out of 14 points, a full point ahead of former World Champion Tigran Petrosian. In 1979, he settled in the United States, and he won the Lone Pine tournament the next year. He led the U.S.team at the Chess Olympiad in 1984.  

He won the U.S. Chess Championship twice, in 1983 and again in 1989, sharing the title with two other players each time.  He briefly took up residence in Washington Square Park in New York City, and hustled chess during the 1980s, making a living playing blitz for stakes, as is popular there.  He had a cameo in the 1993 film Searching for Bobby Fischer.  He also had a brief appearance in "Men Who Would Be Kings", a documentary about chess in Washington Square Park set in the 1980s.

Dzindzichashvili is a well-known theoretician and a chess coach.  Among his students are 5-time US Champion Gata Kamsky and Eugene Perelshteyn.  He is the author and star of multiple chess instructional DVDs entitled "Roman's Lab".  He currently produces instructional videos for Chess.com. Topics include openings, middlegames, endgames, famous players, and interesting games.

He is one of the founders of Chess.net internet chess server project, started in 1993.  He played third board for the "GGGg" team that won the Amateur Team East tournament in February 2008.

Dzindzichashvili vs. computer programs 

Dzindzichashvili played a series of rapid games against the computer program Fritz in 1991 and 1993.  In the following game he checkmated the program in only 28 moves.

Dzindzichashvili vs. Fritz, 1991 1.d4 e6 2.e4 d5 3.e5 c5 4.Nf3 Nc6 5.Bd3 cxd4 6.0-0 Bc5 7.Re1 Nge7 8.Nbd2 0-0 9.Bxh7+ Kxh7 10.Ng5+ Kg6 11.Qg4 Nxe5 12.Rxe5 f5 13.Qg3 Rf7 14.Ndf3 Qh8 15.Nh4+ Qxh4 16.Qxh4 Rf8 17.Qh7+ Kf6 18.Nf3 Ng6 19.Bg5+ Kf7 20.Qh5 Rh8 21.Rxf5+ Kg8 22.Qxg6 exf5 23.Bf6 Rh7 24.Re1 d3 25.Re8+ Bf8 26.Ng5 Rh6 27.Rxf8+ Kxf8 28.Qf7#

In a match held on March 3–7, 2008, Dzindzichashvili played a series of eight games, time control 45'+10", against the computer program Rybka, with Rybka giving odds of pawn and move. The series ended in a 4–4 tie.  A return match, at the same odds, was played on July 28, 2008, at the faster than tournament time control (30'+20"). Rybka 3, running on eight CPUs, won by the score 2½–1½ (1 victory and 3 draws).

Game from 1969 

In 1969, in the USSR, Dzindzichahsvili had a quick win against Grigoryan. 
GM Karen H. Grigoryan (white) vs. Roman Dzindzichahsvili (black)
 ECO code C64, Ruy Lopez opening.
1.e4 e5 2.Nf3 Nc6 3.Bb5 Bc5 4.c3 f5 5.d4 fxe4 6.Ng5 Bb6 7.d5 e3 8.dxc6 bxc6 9.h4 exf2+ 10.Kf1 cxb5 11.Qd5 Nh6 12.Qxa8 c6 13.Ne4 0-0 14.Bg5 b4 (diagram) (prepares 15... Ba6) (0-1)

Further reading

See also
 List of Jewish chess players

References

External links
 

 The Dzindzichashvili– Rybka 3 Handicap Match, Chessbase.com

1944 births
Living people
Chess grandmasters
Chess coaches
American chess players
Chess players from Georgia (country)
Israeli chess players
Soviet chess players
Jewish chess players
Jews from Georgia (country)
Sportspeople from Tbilisi
American people of Georgian-Jewish descent